Kowloon True Light School (KTLS) is a Protestant girls' secondary school , it’s founded in 1945 which situated in Kowloon Tong, Kowloon, Hong Kong. This school is located near Kowloon Tong station.

Like all True Light Middle School in Hong Kong, the predecessor is True Light Seminary, which is the first girl school in South China. Because of the Civil War in 1949, True Light Girl School in Guangzhou moved to Hong Kong and placed on Waterloo Road No.115 (which is Kowloon True Light Primary School for now) and named it as Kowloon True Light Secondary School. It moved to Suffolk Road in 1960.

History
On 16June 1872, True Light School, a primary school, was founded in Guangzhou on the Chinese mainland by Harriet Newell Noyes, a missionary from the American Presbyterian Church. In 1917, the True Light Middle School was established in Guangzhou as a secondary section.

In 1949, due to the communist takeover of Guangzhou, the school transferred to Hong Kong. It was finally relocated to the current site in 1960, with an affiliated primary school and kindergarten opened on its original campus on Waterloo Road. In 1990, the basketball court was demolished, in order to build a new annex. In addition, a six-story new building was completed in 2006.

Principals 

 Ms. Ma Yi Ying (1947-1973)
 Ms. Li Wai Lim (1973-1978)
 Ms. Butt Yee Har (1978-1991)
 Ms. Chan Yuen Sheung (1991-2010)
 Ms. Lee Yi Ying (2010–Present)

Motto

School Motto
”Thou Art the Light of the World” reference from Matthew 5:14.

Motto of the year
2011-2012: Born to love
2012-2013: Thanks giving, positive thinking
2013-2014: Love giving and logical thinking
2014-2015: Embrace uniqueness, uphold collectiveness
2015-2016: Thrive and Fly
2016-2017: It all begins with respect.
2017-2018: Optimism leads to power.
2018-2019: Work with assiduity, grow with perseverance
2019-2020: Only you
2020-2021 :MASTER me
2021-2022:In your shoes, be your pal.
2022-2023 :Where acceptance flows, gratitude can grow.

Uniform
Ever since the establishment, True Light students have always been in light blue Cheongsam and plaits. They can choose to have a ponytail or two plaits since 2011. For PE uniforms, there are four different colours on the shoulder because of the houses. They are Red House, Green House, Purple House and Blue House.

Form Councils
The council began and have kept a 6-year cycle since 1994.

References

See also
True Light Girls' College
True Light Middle School of Hong Kong
Hong Kong True Light College
Education in Hong Kong
List of secondary schools in Hong Kong

Girls' schools in Hong Kong
Primary schools in Hong Kong
Kowloon Tong
Hong Kong Council of the Church of Christ in China
Protestant secondary schools in Hong Kong